Argenis Alberto Fernández Zapata (born April 3, 1987) is a Costa Rican footballer who currently plays for Santos de Guápiles.

Career

Club
Fernández began his career with Santos de Guápiles in the Primera División de Costa Rica, graduating from the youth system to the senior team in 2006.

He was signed by New England Revolution in March 2008 (reportedly for a fee of $300,000, although other reports claim the amount was less). He made his Revolution debut on April 12, 2008, coming on as a half-time substitute in the match against Colorado Rapids. Fernández played in one more game as a substitute before being loaned back to Alajuelense for the remainder of the 2008 Major League Soccer season. He subsequently participated in three different competitions during his time with Alajuelense, making 12 total appearances in the Torneo de Invierno 2008, the Copa Centroamericana and the CONCACAF Champions League.

Fernández was waived by Revolution on April 7, 2009, to make room on the roster for Emmanuel Osei.

He was released  by Alajuelense at the end of the 2011-12 season and he had a short spell at amateur league side Real Lemusa whom he joined in October 2012. He only returned to the Primera Division de Costa Rica after 8 months without a club in 2013 when he rejoined Santos de Guápiles.

International
Fernández played for Costa Rica in the 2007 FIFA U-20 World Cup held in Canada, where he made two appearances for the Ticos.

He made his senior debut for Costa Rica in a January 2010 friendly match against Argentina and has, as of May 2014, earned a total of 2 caps, scoring no goals.

References

External links

 Fernandez to join Revolution - Yahoo Sports
 Revs Add Costa Rica's Argenis Fernandez - Revolution Soccer.net

1987 births
Living people
Association football forwards
People from Puntarenas Province
Costa Rican footballers
Costa Rica international footballers
Santos de Guápiles footballers
New England Revolution players
L.D. Alajuelense footballers
Costa Rican expatriate footballers
Expatriate soccer players in the United States
Liga FPD players
Major League Soccer players